
Gmina Brody is a rural gmina (administrative district) in Żary County, Lubusz Voivodeship, in western Poland, on the German border.

The gmina contains part of the protected area called Muskau Bend Landscape Park.

Villages
Gmina Brody contains the villages and settlements of Biecz, Brody, Brożek, Datyń, Grodziszcze, Jałowice, Janiszowice, Jasienica, Jeziory Dolne, Koło, Kumiałtowice, Laski, Marianka, Nabłoto, Proszów, Suchodół, Wierzchno, Zasieki and Żytni Młyn.

Neighbouring gminas
Gmina Brody is bordered by the gminas of Gubin, Lubsko, Trzebiel and Tuplice. It also borders Germany.

Twin towns – sister cities

Gmina Brody is twinned with:
 Forst, Germany
 Lubsko, Poland

References

Brody
Gmina Brody